Booneville High School may refer to:

 Booneville High School (Arkansas) - Booneville, Arkansas
 Booneville High School (Mississippi) - Booneville, Mississippi